Uschi Elleot (1899–1975) was a German stage and film actress who starred in a number of silent films. She was the younger sister of actress Carola Toelle. After her cinema career ended she emigrated to the United States and married an American.

Selected filmography
 The White Roses of Ravensberg (1919)
 The Black Forest Girl (1920)
 Death the Victor (1920)
 You Are the Life (1921)
 The Handicap of Love (1921)
 Marie Antoinette, the Love of a King (1922)
 Yellow Star (1922)
 La Boheme (1923)
 Lord Reginald's Derby Ride (1924)
 A Dream of Happiness (1924)
 The Alternative Bride (1925)
 In the Valleys of the Southern Rhine (1925)
 The Marriage Swindler (1925)

References

Bibliography
 Giesen, Rolf. The Nosferatu Story: The Seminal Horror Film, Its Predecessors and Its Enduring Legacy. McFarland, 2019.
 Goble, Alan. The Complete Index to Literary Sources in Film. Walter de Gruyter, 1999.
 Hardt, Ursula. From Caligari to California: Erich Pommer's Life in the International Film Wars. Berghahn Books, 1996.

External links

1899 births
1975 deaths
German film actresses
German stage actresses
German silent film actresses
Film people from Berlin
German emigrants to the United States

de:Uschi Elleot